The Silver Brumby is a 1958 novel for children by Australian author Elyne Mitchell.  It was commended for the Children's Book of the Year Award: Older Readers in 1959.

Story outline
The story follows the fortunes of a young stallion in a herd of brumbies in the Australian mountain country as he fights his way to the leadership of the herd.

Critical reception
The reviewer in The Bulletin had a few reservations about the book: "One has some doubts about the way the horses talk in it - Mrs. Mitchell, with her essentially realistic approach, hasn't set up quite the right climate of fantasy where this could be acceptable - and, with one brumby-hunt following another and the stallions incessantly fighting, it is a bit repetitive: but against that Mrs. Mitchell does know her country and does know her brumbies."

Adaptation
The novel was adapted for film in 1993, with the title altered to The Silver Stallion for the US market. The film was directed by John Tatoulis, from a script by Mitchell, Jon Stephens, and Tatoulis, and featured Caroline Goodall and Russell Crowe.

The novel was also adapted as an animated television series in 1998; the series consisted of 39 25-minute episodes. The series was written by Judy Malmgren, Stephens, and Paul Williams, and featured Brett Climo, Rebecca Gibney and Rhys Muldoon in vocal roles.

Awards
 1959 – commended Children's Book of the Year Award: Older Readers

See also
 1958 in Australian literature

References

Australian children's novels
1958 Australian novels
1958 children's books